Soboroff is a surname. Notable people with the surname include:

Jacob Soboroff (born 1983), American television correspondent
Steve Soboroff (born 1948), American police commissioner